Elwood Smith may refer to:

 Mike Smith (1920s outfielder) or Elwood Hope Smith (1904–1981), professional baseball player 
 Elwood Smith (actor), American actor who was in Boy! What a Girl!
 Elwood Smith, illustrator who worked on books by Peter Mandel and René Colato Laínez